Lady Possessed is a 1952 American film noir mystery film directed by William Spier and Roy Kellino and starring James Mason and June Havoc. Mason and his wife Pamela produced and wrote the film themselves, based on Pamela's novel Del Palma (originally published as A Lady Possessed in Britain, 1943). They chose Pamela's ex-husband Roy Kellino, with whom she remained close, to direct the film. It was a critical and commercial failure, losing the Masons much of the money they had invested in it.

The film's sets were designed by the art director Frank Arrigo.

Plot
While barely conscious, Jean Wilson (June Havoc), a patient in a London hospital, overhears Jimmy Del Palma (James Mason) berating hospital staff for their treatment of his wife, who then dies shortly afterwards. To recuperate following a miscarriage, Jean coincidentally rents the former country home of Del Palma, a famous pianist, and his wife. She starts to fall in love with the absent musician and dreams of taking his dead wife's place, even of being taken over and possessed by her. With the encouragement of her friend Sybil (Pamela Mason), Jean arranges a seance with a medium in an attempt to contact the dead woman.

Cast
 James Mason as Jimmy Del Palma 
 June Havoc as Jean Wilson 
 Stephen Dunne as Tom Wilson 
 Fay Compton as Mme. Brune  
 Pamela Mason as Sybil (as Pamela Kellino)
 Steven Geray as Dr. Stepanek  
 Diana Graves as Medium  
 Odette Myrtil as Mrs. Burrows  
 Eileen Erskine as Violet  
 John Monaghan as Dave (as John P. Monaghan)
 Vivian Bonnell as Calypso Singer (as Enid Mosier)
 Judy Osborne as Secretary (as Judy Osborn)

Critical reception
Bosley Crowther in The New York Times called it "a bleak little drama of neuroses," concluding "And since Miss Kellino and Mr. Mason take credit for writing the script, the much celebrated English couple have only themselves to blame. That goes double for Mr. Mason, who also produced the film"; TV Guide wrote "Neither the performances nor the narrow direction are able to help save this confusing script." and Classic Film Freak wrote "Lady Possessed is a film that’s hard to find and will most likely stay that way as there isn’t much to recommend it outside of James Mason’s performance, though even that gets overwhelmed by a disjointed plot."

References

Bibliography
 Sweeney, Kevin. James Mason: A Bio-bibliography. Greenwood Publishing Group, 1999.

External links
 
 
 

1952 films
Film noir
1950s mystery films
American mystery films
Films directed by Roy Kellino
Films scored by Nathan Scott
Republic Pictures films
American black-and-white films
1950s English-language films
1950s American films